Chester Lillis Johnson (August 1, 1917 – April 10, 1983) was an American professional baseball pitcher who appeared in five games in Major League Baseball for the St. Louis Browns in . He was born in Redmond, Washington; a younger brother, Earl, also a southpaw, pitched for the Boston Red Sox and the Detroit Tigers for eight seasons between 1940 and 1951. 

Chet Johnson attended the University of Washington, where he played college baseball for the Huskies from 1937–1939. Johnson entered pro baseball in 1939, and his active career would continue for the next 18 seasons, all of them in the minor leagues, apart from his month-long stint with the Browns in September 1946.

During his MLB trial, Johnson made three starts and appeared twice in relief. He did not register a decision or a save, allowing 20 hits, 13 bases on balls and ten earned runs in 18 innings pitched. He struck out eight. He retired from the game in 1956 as a member of the Sacramento Solons, one of six Pacific Coast League teams he played for during his 13 full or partial seasons in that circuit.

References

External links

1917 births
1983 deaths
Ballard High School (Seattle, Washington) alumni
Bakersfield Badgers players
Baseball players from Washington (state)
El Paso Texans players
Hollywood Stars players
Indianapolis Indians players
Major League Baseball pitchers
Oakland Oaks (baseball) players
Sacramento Solons players
St. Louis Browns players
San Diego Padres (minor league) players
San Francisco Seals (baseball) players
Seattle Rainiers players
Sportspeople from King County, Washington
Tacoma Tigers players
Toledo Mud Hens players
Washington Huskies baseball players